Dennis Kemp (born March 21, 1946) was a Canadian football player who played for the Calgary Stampeders. He won the Grey Cup with Calgary in 1971. He played college football at the University of Tulsa.

References

1946 births
Living people
Calgary Stampeders players
Detroit Wheels players
Tulsa Golden Hurricane football players
American football offensive tackles
Canadian football offensive linemen
Players of American football from Santa Monica, California
American players of Canadian football